Isaiah Hodgins (born October 21, 1998) is an American football wide receiver for the New York Giants of the National Football League (NFL). He played college football at Oregon State and was drafted by the Buffalo Bills in the sixth round of the 2020 NFL Draft.

Early years
Hodgins attended Berean Christian High School in Walnut Creek, California. A 4-star recruit, he committed to Oregon State University (OSU) to play college football over offers from Nebraska, Oregon, and Washington State, among others.

College career
Hodgins entered his true freshman year at Oregon State in 2017 as a starter. Overall he started six of 11 games, catching 31 passes for 275 yards and two touchdowns. As a sophomore in 2018, he started nine of 11 games, recording 59 receptions for 876 yards and five touchdowns. He returned as a starter his junior year in 2019.  Following a junior season where he caught 86 passes for 1,171 yards and 13 touchdowns, Hodgins announced that he would forgo his senior season and declared for the 2020 NFL Draft.

College statistics

Professional career

Buffalo Bills
The Buffalo Bills selected Hodgins in the sixth round, 207th overall, of the 2020 NFL Draft. On May 7, 2020, Hodgins signed a four-year, $3.45 million contract, including a $158,888 signing bonus, with the Bills. He was placed on injured reserve on September 6, 2020. He was designated to return from injured reserve on November 24, and began practicing with the team again, but underwent shoulder surgery on December 8 and missed the remainder of the season.

On August 31, 2021, Hodgins was waived from the Bills and re-signed to the practice squad the next day. On December 26, 2021, Hodgins made his NFL debut in the Bills' week 16 game against the New England Patriots. After the Bills were eliminated in the Divisional Round of the 2021 playoffs, he signed a reserve/future contract on January 24, 2022.

On August 30, 2022, Hodgins was waived by the Bills and signed to the practice squad the next day. He was promoted to the active roster on October 8. Hodgins caught his first four NFL passes in a 38–3 week 5 win over the Pittsburgh Steelers. He was waived on November 1.

New York Giants
On November 2, 2022, the New York Giants claimed Hodgins off waivers. He emerged as a key member of the Giants' offense during the second half of their 2022 season, catching touchdowns in four of his last five regular season games and racking up 351 yards on 33 receptions. 

During the NFC wild card round playoff game against the Minnesota Vikings, Hodgins finished with 105 receiving yards and a touchdown on eight receptions as the Giants earned a 31-24 victory.

On February 19, 2023, Hodgins re-signed on a one-year contract.

Personal life
Hodgins' parents are Stephanie and James Hodgins. His father was a fullback in the NFL, winning a Super Bowl with the St. Louis Rams. His brother, Isaac, plays college football at Oregon State at the defensive line position. Hodgins is a Christian.

References

External links
Oregon State Beavers bio

1998 births
Living people
Players of American football from San Jose, California
American football wide receivers
Oregon State Beavers football players
Buffalo Bills players
New York Giants players